It's Only Rock & Roll was a Canadian television variety show, which aired on CBC Television as a summer series in 1987. Produced by Joe Bodolai and directed by Allan Novak, Henry Sarwer-Foner and Joan Tosoni, the series mixed rock music-themed comedy sketches with live performances by real musicians.

The series premiered in prime time, before moving to its regular time slot on Friday nights at 11:30 p.m. as a companion to the network's music video series Good Rockin' Tonite.

Personalities associated with the show included Ted Woloshyn, Dan Gallagher and Taborah Johnson as hosts, with comedians from The Second City's Toronto cast, including Dana Andersen, Bob Bainborough and Mike Myers, in the comedy sketches. Myers later took several of his recurring characters from the show to Saturday Night Live, including Wayne from Wayne's World (from Wayne's Power Minute) and Dieter from Sprockets.

The series won the award for Best Comedy or Variety Series at the 1988 Gemini Awards.

References

External links

1980s Canadian music television series
CBC Television original programming
1987 Canadian television series debuts
1987 Canadian television series endings
Canadian Screen Award-winning television shows
1980s Canadian sketch comedy television series
Canadian late-night television programming